Audio Research Corporation is one of the oldest manufacturers of high-end audio equipment still in operation. They company were known to be pioneers at advancing state-of-the-art audio reproduction in the 1970s, and for re-introducing the vacuum tube as the primary active amplification device. With the help of reviews in audiophile publications such as Stereophile and The Absolute Sound, they solidified their position as a well-respected audio manufacturers. Many industry observers consider the founder, William Z. Johnson, as one of the true originators of the entire concept of high-end audio as it exists today.

History
The company was founded by William Zane Johnson in 1970 and was originally located in Minneapolis, Minnesota. Audio Research moved from Plymouth to Maple Grove, MN in August 2018. Johnson began designing custom audio electronics in the early 1950s and was the former owner of Electronic Industries, a specialty audio retail store in Minneapolis until the mid-1960s. Johnson died on December 10, 2011, in Rancho Mirage, California, at the age of 85.

In 2008, Audio Research was acquired by Fine Sounds SpA, which owned Sonus faber loudspeakers. Fine Sounds acquired several other highly esteemed high-end audio companies, including Sumiko, Wadia, and McIntosh Laboratories. In 2014, Fine Sounds Group was purchased by a group headed by Charles Randall and Mauro Grange. In 2016 the group was renamed McIntosh Group.

In late August 2020, Audio Research was acquired by TWS Enterprises, LLC, a privately held company owned wholly by Trent Suggs, former North American Sales Manager. TWS Enterprises, LLC is a privately-owned company created to hold Audio Research equities; it is not part of a group. The objective for TWS Enterprises is to further enhance brand reputation and to focus on the unique processes that nourish the culture and product innovation at Audio Research.

References

Further reading
 Audio Research: Making the Music Glow (2020)

External links

Electronics companies established in 1970
Audio equipment manufacturers of the United States
Audio amplifier manufacturers
Companies based in Plymouth, Minnesota
1970 establishments in Minnesota